Julie Halpern is an American author of popular young adult novels. She is married to the children’s book author and illustrator Matthew Cordell, with whom she created the picture book Toby and the Snowflakes.

Halpern's teen novels focus on the challenges facing teens who are outsiders. Her debut novel Get Well Soon tells the story of a teenage girl in a mental institution, where she goes after suffering from depression. Her second novel, Into the Wild Nerd Yonder, is about a girl who struggles with high school social labels when she meets a new group of friends who play Dungeons & Dragons.

Kirkus reviews named Get Well Soon a Best Young Adult Book of 2007.

Bibliography
 Toby and the Snowflakes, Houghton Mifflin Harcourt, 2004
 Get Well Soon, Feiwel & Friends, 2007
 Into the Wild Nerd Yonder, Feiwel & Friends, 2009
 Don’t Stop Now, Feiwel & Friends, 2011
 Have a Nice Day, Feiwel & Friends, 2012
 The F- It List, Feiwel & Friends, 2013
 Maternity Leave, Thomas Dunne Books, 2015
Meant to Be, Feiwel & Friends, 2017
Girl on the Ferris Wheel (with Len Vlahos), Feiwel & Friends, 2021

References

External links
 

21st-century American novelists
American women novelists
Living people
21st-century American women writers
Year of birth missing (living people)